Lockhart Township is one of nine townships in Pike County, Indiana, United States. As of the 2010 census, its population was 907 and it contained 433 housing units.

History
Lockhart Township was organized in 1852.

Geography

Unincorporated towns
 Augusta at 
 Fritz Corner at 
 Hartwell at 
 Pikeville at 
 Stendal at 
(This list is based on USGS data and may include former settlements.)

Cemeteries
The township contains these cemeteries: Barrett also known as Bethel Cemetery, Augusta IOOF also known as Odd Fellows, which is located southeast of the town of Augusta, Cup Creek which is located southwest of Pikeville and is also known as Pikeville Cemetery, Indian Mound Graveyard near Stendal, Log Creek also known as South Fork Cemetery southwest of Stendal, Miller which is northwest of Pikeville, Old Augusta Methodist Church Cemetery (church gone) which is located in the middle of the town of Augusta and is now obsolete, Pikeville Church of Christ (obsolete), Pikeville German Lutheran also known as the Primitive Baptist (obsolete cemetery with many unmarked graves), Russell which is southwest of Pikeville, Stendal St. Paul's Evangelical Lutheran Church on the north edge of the town of Stendal, Stendal St. Peter's Lutheran located in the town of Stendal, Zion's Hill located one mile south of Pikevill, also known as Zion's Hill Assembly of God, Zoar located four miles east of Stendal, and Stillwell located half-mile east of Pikeville.

Major highways

School districts
 Pike County School Corporation

Political districts
 State House District 63
 State Senate District 48

References
 
 United States Census Bureau 2009 TIGER/Line Shapefiles
 IndianaMap

External links
 Indiana Township Association
 United Township Association of Indiana
 City-Data.com page for Lockhart Township

Townships in Pike County, Indiana
Jasper, Indiana micropolitan area
Townships in Indiana